Greatest Hits is the greatest hits album by American country music artist Joe Nichols. It was released on January 25, 2011 by Show Dog-Universal Music.

Track listing

Chart performance

Weekly charts

Year-end charts

References

2011 greatest hits albums
Joe Nichols albums
Show Dog-Universal Music compilation albums